Amy Harris may refer to:
 Amy B. Harris or Amy Harris (born 1970/71), TV and film producer and writer
 Amy Harris (sprinter) (born 1980), Australian sprint runner
 Amy Harris (dancer) (born 1983), Australian ballet dancer
 Amy Harris (long jumper) (born 1987), English long jumper
 Amy Payne (née Harris), British journalist who works on East Midlands Today
 Amy Harris, a character in The Ghost Squad